Allan Oras (born 20 December 1975) is an Estonian cyclist.

He was born in Tartu. In 1994 he graduated from Tartu School of Construction and Light Industry.

He began his cycling career in 1988, coached by Harald Osjamets. From 1991 to 2001 his coach was Rein Pruuli. In 2019 he won the gold medal at the European Mountain Bike Championships in the cross-country marathon. He is multiple-times Estonian champion in different cycling disciplines. From 1995 to 2011 he was a member of Estonian national cycling team.

Major results

Road

1997
 2nd Road race, National Road Championships
1999
 National Road Championships
2nd Time trial
3rd Road race
2000
 3rd Time trial, National Road Championships
2004
 5th Tartu GP
2005
 1st Tour de Corrèze
2006
 2nd Road race, National Road Championships
 2nd Tartu GP
2007
 3rd Road race, National Road Championships
2008
 2nd Time trial, National Road Championships
2009
 6th Tartu GP
 10th Scandinavian Open Road Race
2010
 6th Tartu GP

MTB
2009
 1st  European XCM Championships

References

External links

Living people
1975 births
Estonian male cyclists
Sportspeople from Tartu